The history of gambling in the United States covers gambling and gaming since the colonial period.

Colonial

Games of chance came to the British-American colonies with the first settlers. Attitudes toward gambling varied greatly from community to community, but there were no large-scale restrictions on the practice at the time.

By the 1680s, an emerging upper class in Virginia cemented their economic status through an iron grip on gambling in horse racing. Heavy betters demonstrated their courage and skill while promoting a sense of shared values and consciousness among the social elite. This group of wealthy Virginian landowners made elaborate rules, established by formal codes that dictated how much to bet, and marginalized the role of the non-elite. They developed a code of honor regarding acquisitiveness, individualism, materialism, personal relationships, and the right to be rulers. Not until the mid-18th century, when Baptists and Methodists denounced gambling as sinful, was there any challenge to the social, political, and economic dominance of this Virginian over-class.

Historian Neal Millikan found approximately 392 lotteries that were held in the 13 colonies using newspaper advertisements in the colonial era.

Lotteries were used not only as a form of entertainment but as a source of revenue to help fund each of the original 13 colonies. The financiers of Jamestown, Virginia funded lotteries to raise money to support their colony.   These lotteries often featured instant winners. In 1769, a restriction was placed on lotteries by the British Crown and became one of many issues that fueled tensions between the Colonies and Britain before the American Revolution.

Early national trends

Lotteries continued to be used at the state and federal level in pre-revolutionary America. New Orleans emerged as the nation's leading gambling center. A wave of hostility against the sinfulness of gambling emerged in the religious revivals that comprised the Second Great Awakening and the Third Great Awakening. Moralists concentrated on state legislatures, passing laws to restrict gambling, pleasure halls, horse racing, and violations of the Sabbath (working on Sundays). Despite the attempted restrictions, gambling houses grew in popularity in various communities across the colonies. Local judge Jacob Rush told men "that not all sports were banned, only those associated with gambling. Unadulterated amusement was permissible". Rush continued to condemn gambling as immoral, because "it tyrannises the people beyond their control, reducing them to poverty and wretchedness. The mind is deeply contaminated, and sentiments, the most hostile to its final peace and happiness, are harbored and indulged."

English writer Harriet Martineau described the deportment and social station of a professional gambler she encountered while traveling through modern-day West Virginia to the then-burgeoning spa town of White Sulphur Springs:One of the personages whom I referred to as low company, at the beginning of my story, declared himself in the stage-coach to be a gambler, about to visit the Springs for professional purposes. He said to another man, who looked fit company for him, that he played higher at faro than any man in the country but one. These two men slept while we were mounting to the Hawk's Nest. People who pursue their profession by night, as such people do, must sleep in the day, happen what may. They were rather self-important during the journey; it was a comfort to see how poor a figure they cut at the Springs. They seemed to sink into the deepest insignificance that could be desired. Such persons are the pests of society in the south and west; and they are apt to boast that their profession is highly profitable in the eastern cities. I fear this is no empty vaunt.

Gambling was made illegal and forced to relocate to safe havens such as New Orleans or on riverboats where the captain was the only law in force. Anti-gambling movements shut down the lotteries. As railroads replaced riverboat travel, other venues were closed. The increasing pressure of legal prohibitions on gambling created risks and opportunities for illegal operations.

Frontier
From 1848 to 1855, the California Gold Rush attracted ambitious young prospectors from around the world, to prospect for gold and gamble away were two sides of their manliness. By the 1850s, the influx of aspiring prospectors had made San Francisco a world-famous city. San Francisco had overtaken New Orleans as the gambling capital of the US. However, as respectability set in, California gradually strengthened its laws and its policing of gambling; the games went underground.

Gambling was popular on the frontier during the settlement of the West; nearly everyone participated in games of chance. Towns at the end of the cattle trails such as Deadwood, South Dakota or Dodge City, Kansas, and major railway hubs such as Kansas City and Denver were famous for their many lavish gambling houses. Frontier gamblers had become the local elite.  At the top of the line, riverboat gamblers dressed smartly, wore expensive jewelry, and exuded refined respectability.

Late 19th century

Horse racing
Horse racing started as an expensive hobby for the very rich, especially in the South, but the Civil War destroyed the affluence it rested upon. The sport made a come back in the Northeast, under the leadership of elite jockey clubs that operated the most prestigious racetracks. As a spectator sport, the races attracted an affluent audience, as well as struggling, working-class gamblers. The racetracks closely controlled the situation to prevent fraud and keep the sport honest. Off-track, bookmakers relied upon communication systems such as the telegraph and a system of runners which attracted a much wider audience. However, the bookmakers paid off the odds that were set honestly at the racetrack.

Chicago
In Chicago, like other rapidly growing industrial centers with large immigrant and migrant working-class neighborhoods, gambling was a major issue, and in some contexts a vice. The city's wealthy urban elite had private clubs and closely supervised horse racing tracks. The workers, who discovered freedom and independence in gambling, discovered a world apart from their closely supervised factory jobs. They gambled to validate the risk-taking aspect of masculinity, betting heavily on dice, card games, policy, and cockfights. Already by the 1850s, hundreds of saloons offered gambling opportunities, including off-track betting on the horses. Historian Mark Holler, argues that organized crime provided upward mobility to ambitious people in poverty-stricken non-white communities. The high-income, high-visibility vice lords and racketeers built their careers and profits in these low-income neighborhoods, often branching into local politics to protect their domains.  For example, in 1868–1888, Chicago linchpin, Michael C. McDonald—"The Gambler King of Clark Street"—kept numerous Democratic machine politicians on expense accounting to protect his gambling empire and keep the reformers at bay.

In larger cities, the exploitation, inherent in illegal gambling and prostitution, was restricted to geographically-segregated red-light districts. The business owners, both legitimate and illicit, were pressured into making scheduled payments to corrupt police and politicians, which they disguised as a licensing expense. The informal rates became standardized, for example, in Chicago in 1912, in ranges of $20 a month for a cheap brothel to $1000 a month for luxurious bordellos. Reformist elements never accepted the segregated vice districts and they wanted them all permanently shut down. In large cities, an influential system of racketeers and a vicious clique of vice lords was economically, socially and politically powerful enough to keep the reformers and upright law-enforcement at bay. Finally, around 1900–1910, the reformers with the support of law enforcement and legislative backing, grew politically strong enough to shut down the destructive system of vice and the survivors went underground.

20th century

Numbers racket

Segregated neighborhoods in larger cities starting in the late 19th century were the scene of numerous underground "numbers games", typically controlled by criminals who paid off the local police, they operated out of inconspicuous "policy shops" usually a saloon, where bettors chose numbers. In 1875, a report of a select committee of the New York State Assembly stated that "the lowest, meanest, worst form ... [that] gambling takes in the city of New York, is what is known as policy playing". The game was also popular in Italian neighborhoods known as the Italian lottery, and it was known in Cuban communities as bolita ("little ball"). In the early 20th century, the game was associated with big-city slums and could be played for pennies. The bookies would even extend credit, and there were no deductions for taxes. Illegal gambling, which had the same organizers and support systems as illegal liquors in the 1920s, lead to powerful criminal syndicates in most large cities.

Reformers
Reformers led by the evangelical (Protestant) Christian movement, succeeded in passing state laws that closed nearly all the race tracks by 1917. However, slot machines, gambling houses, betting parlors, and policy games flourished, just as illegal alcohol did during Prohibition.  Horse-racing made their comeback in the 1920s, as state governments legalized on-track betting as a popular source for state revenue and legalized off-track betting regained its popularity. 

The Great Depression saw the legalization of some forms of gambling such as bingo in some cities to allow churches and charities to raise money, but most gambling remained illegal. In the 1930s, 21 states opened race tracks.

Localities
Some cities such as Miami, the "Free State of Galveston in Texas," and Hot Springs, Arkansas, became regional gambling centers, attracting gamblers from more prudish rural areas.

New York City
At the turn-of-the-century in 1900, gambling was illegal but widespread in New York City. The favorite activities included games of chance such as cards, dice and numbers, and betting on sports events, chiefly horse racing. In the upper class, gambling was handled discreetly in the expensive private clubs, the most famous of which was operated by Richard Canfield, who operated the Saratoga Club. Prominent players included Reggie Vanderbilt and John Bet-a-Million Gates.  The chief competitor to Canfield was the "Bronze Door," operated 1891–1917, by a syndicate of gamblers closely linked to the Democratic machine represented by Tammany Hall. These elite establishments were illegal and paid off the police and politicians as needed. The working-class was served by hundreds of neighbourhood gambling parlours, featuring faro card games, and the omnipresent policy shops where poor folks could bet a few pennies on the daily numbers, and be quickly paid off so they could gamble again. Betting on horse racing was allowed only at the tracks themselves, where the controls were tight. The most famous venue was Belmont Park, a complex of five racecourses, a 12,000 seat grandstand, and multiple stables, centred around a lavish clubhouse. Middle-class gamblers could frequent the city's race tracks, but the centre of middle-class moral gravity was strongly opposed to all forms of gambling. The reform movements were strongest in the 1890s. They were led by men such as the Reverend Charles H. Parkhurst, the leading Presbyterian pastor and president of the New York Society for the Prevention of Crime; reform mayor William L. Strong, and his police commissioner Theodore Roosevelt. Reformers passed laws in the state legislature against any emerging gambling venue. Such laws were enforced in most of the small towns and rural areas, but not in New York's larger cities, where political machines controlled the police and the courts.

Another common gambling activity during this period was betting on political elections. Betting on United States presidential elections from around 1868 to 1940 was practiced on a large scale, centered on New York city, which conducted an estimated half of the activity. The money spent on election betting even occasionally exceeded trading done on the stock exchanges of Wall Street. The odds from the betting markets were often used as a way to predict the outcome of an election. Election betting generally declined leading up to the second world war, due to a combination of factors, including increased legal restrictions, being crowded out by horse betting, and the rise of scientific polling like Gallup, which correctly predicted the outcome of the 1940 election.

Saratoga Springs
After 1870, Saratoga Springs, near Albany in upstate New York, became the nation's top upscale resort relying on natural mineral springs, horse racing, gambling, and luxury hotels, according to Janet Paraschos. World War II imposed severe travel restrictions which kept the vast majority of gamblers away and financially ruined the establishments. Since 1970, there has been a revival of legal betting with a renovated racetrack, a 28-day exclusive racing season, a new interstate, winter sports opportunities, and an influx of vacationing young professionals.

Cleveland
Horse racing has a long history in Cleveland, as elites by the 1860s, worked to keep gamblers and criminals at bay.

The Mayfield Road Mob, based in the Little Italy district, became a powerful local crime syndicate in the 1920s and 1930s, through bootlegging and illegal gambling. Local gangsters worked deals with the Jewish-Cleveland Syndicate,  which operated laundries, casinos, and nightclubs. Both groups profited from illegal gambling, bookmaking, loan sharking, and labor rackets in northern Ohio.<ref>See [https://case.edu/ech/articles/m/mayfield-rd-mob "Mayfield Rd. Mob  Encyclopedia Of Cleveland History ]</ref>

The "Harvard Club" (named after its Harvard street location in the Cleveland suburbs) operated in 1930–41, as one of the largest gambling operations attracting customers from as far as New York and Chicago. It moved to different locations on Harvard Street, which accommodated 500–1,000 gamblers who came to shoot craps and to play the slot machines, roulette, and all-night poker. It defied numerous raids until it was finally shut down by Frank Lausche in 1941.

Eliot Ness, after building a crime-fighting national reputation in Chicago, took on Cleveland, 1934–1942. He tried to suppressed labor-union protection rackets, illegal liquor suppliers, and gambling, but his reputation suffered.

Legalisation in states

To overcome the Great Depression, Nevada legalised gambling as a way to bring economic relief. In 1931, Nevada legalised most forms of gambling when Assembly Bill 98 was signed into law, providing a source of revenue for the state. Interest in development in the state was slow at first, as the state itself had a limited population. After 1945, enforcement of gambling laws became more strict in most places and the resort town of Las Vegas became an attractive target for investment by crime figures such as New York's Bugsy Siegel. The town rapidly developed during the 1950s, dooming some illegal gambling venues such as Galveston.  Thanks to cheap air travel and auto access from California, Nevada, and Las Vegas, in particular, it became the centre of gambling in the U.S. In the 1960s, Howard Hughes and other legitimate investors purchased many of the most important hotels and casinos in the city, gradually eliminating the city's connections to organized crime.

Southern Maryland became popular for its slot machines which operated legally there between 1949 (1943 in some places) and 1968. In 1977, New Jersey legalized gambling in Atlantic City. The city rapidly grew into a significant tourist destination, briefly revitalising what was previously largely a run-down slum community. In 1979, the Seminole tribe opened the first reservation-based commercial gambling beginning a trend that would be followed by other reservations. Gradually, lotteries and some types of parimutuel betting were legalised in other areas of the country.

In the 1990s, riverboat casinos were legalised in Louisiana and Illinois in addition to other states. In 1996, Michigan legalised gambling in the city of Detroit, creating an economic centre for potential casino growth. In an attempt to curb the ill effects of the rapid rise in gambling on sporting events, Congress passed the Professional and Amateur Sports Protection Act of 1992. This act was overturned by the Supreme Court in 2018, because the court deemed it was unconstitutional for the federal government to prohibit states from legalised it under state law.

In the early 21st century, Internet gambling grew rapidly in popularity worldwide. Global Internet gambling reaching US$34 billion in 2011. This is higher than worldwide movie box office revenues and represents 9% of the international gambling market.  However, interstate and international transactions remained illegal under the Federal Wire Act of 1961, with additional penalties added by the Unlawful Internet Gambling Enforcement Act of 2006.

See also
 Gambling
 Gambling in the United States
 History of gambling in the United Kingdom
 Casino
 Lotteries in the United States
 Numbers game
 Online gambling
 Gambler's fallacy

Notes

 Further reading 
 Abt, Vicki, James F. Smith, and Eugene Martin Christiansen, eds. The business of risk: Commercial gambling in mainstream America (University Press of Kansas, 1985).
 Bernhard, Bo J., Robert Futrell, and Andrew Harper. "Shots from the Pulpit:An Ethnographic Content Analysis of United States Anti-Gambling Social Movement Documents from 1816-2010." UNLV Gaming Research & Review Journal 14.2 (2010): 2. Online
 Breen, Timothy H. "Horses and Gentlemen: The Cultural Significance of Gambling among the Gentry in Virginia,"  William and Mary Quarterly 34 (1977) 239–257. online
 Burnham, John C., ed. Bad Habits: Drinking, smoking, taking drugs, gambling, sexual misbehavior and swearing in American History (NYU Press, 1992).
 Chafetz, Henry. Play the Devil: A History of Gambling in the United States from 1492 to 1955 (1960), popular history.
 Davis, James A., and Lloyd E. Hudman. "The history of Indian gaming law and casino development in the western United States." in Alan A. Lew, ed., Tourism and gaming on American Indian land (1998): 82–92.
 Fabian, Ann. Card Sharps, Dream Books, and Bucket Shops: Gambling in 19th Century America.  (Cornell University Press, 1990). 
 Ferentzy, Peter, and Nigel Turner. "Gambling and organized crime-A review of the literature." Journal of Gambling Issues 23 (2009): 111–155. Online
 Findlay, John M.  People of Chance: Gambling in American Society from Jamestown to Las Vegas (Oxford University Press, 1986).
 Goodman, Robert. The luck business (Simon and Schuster, 1996), attacks the business
 Haller, Mark H. "The changing structure of American gambling in the twentieth century." Journal of Social Issues 35.3 (1979): 87-114.
 Hoffman, David Lynn, Debora J. Gilliard, and Sally Baalbaki-Yassine. "An Industry in Decline: Can US Horse Racing Turn the Corner?." Journal of Marketing Development & Competitiveness 14.1 (2020). online

 Lears, Jackson. Something for Nothing: Luck in America (2003). 
 Lang, Arne K. Sports betting and bookmaking: An American history (Rowman & Littlefield, 2016).
 Meyer-Arendt, Klaus, And Rudi Hartmann, eds. ''''Casino Gambling in America: Origins, Trends, and Impacts (1998) 
 O'Brien, Timothy L. Bad Bet: The Inside Story of the Glamour, Glitz, and Danger of America's Gambling Industry (1998).
 Riess, Steven. "The cyclical history of horse racing: the USA's oldest and (sometimes) most popular spectator sport." International Journal of the History of Sport 31.1-2 (2014): 29-54. 

 Sallaz, Jeff. The labor of luck: Casino capitalism in the United States and South Africa (U of California Press, 2009).* Longstreet, Stephen. Win or Lose: A Social History of Gambling in America  (1977)
 Schwartz, David G. Roll The Bones: The History of Gambling (2006), scholarly history with a global perspective; covers the U.S. in chapters 7, 11, 12, 15–18.
 Thompson, William N. Gambling in America: An encyclopedia of history, issues, and society (Abc-Clio, 2001).

State and local
 Asbury, Herbert. Sucker's Progress: An Informal History of Gambling in America (1938), covers numerous cities
 Cunningham, Gary L. "Chance, Culture and Compulsion: The Gambling Games of the Kansas Cattle Towns." Nevada Historical Society Quarterly (1983) 26: 255–271.
 Dasgupta, Anisha S. "Public Finance and the Fortunes of the Early American Lottery." QLR 24 (2005): 227+. Online
 Haller, Mark H. “Organized Crime in Urban Society: Chicago in the Twentieth Century.” Journal of Social History,  5#2 (1971), pp. 210–34, online
 
 Henricks, Kasey and David G. Embrick. ed. State Lotteries Historical Continuity, Rearticulations of Racism, and American Taxation (2016) Online
 Karmel, James R. Gambling on the American dream: Atlantic City and the casino era (2015).
 Musser, Wesley N., et al. "Economic Impact of Horse Racing in Maryland." Policy Analysis Report 99-01 (1999).

 Peck, Gunther. “Manly Gambles: The Politics of Risk on the Comstock Lode, 1860–1880,” Journal of Social History 26 (1993)
 Riess, Steven A. The Sport of Kings and the Kings of Crime: Horse Racing, Politics, and Organized Crime in New York 1865–1913 (Syracuse UP, 2011). online review

 Royer, Jennifer Baugh. "A dark side of Dixie: Illegal gambling in Northern Kentucky, 1790–2000" (PhD dissertation,  Texas Christian University, 2009).
 Sparks, Randy J. "Gentleman's sport: horse racing in antebellum Charleston." South Carolina Historical Magazine 93.1 (1992): 15-30. online

 
 Weaver, Karol K. "“It's the Union Man That Holds the Winning Hand”: Gambling in Pennsylvania's Anthracite Region." Pennsylvania History 80.3 (2013): 401-419. Online
 Williamson, Ron. Frontier Gambling: The Games, the Gamblers, & the Great Gambling Halls of the Old West (2011).  excerpt

Lotteries
 Clotfelter, Charles T., and Philip J. Cook. Selling hope: State lotteries in America (Harvard UP, 1991).
 Dasgupta, Anisha S. "Public Finance and the Fortunes of the Early American Lottery." QLR 24 (2005): 227+ Online
 Ezell, John. Fortune’s Merry Wheel: The Lottery In America  (1960). online free to borrow
 Goodman, Robert. The luck business (Simon and Schuster, 1996), attacks gambling.
 
 Munting, Roger. An economic and social history of gambling in Britain and the USA (Manchester UP, 1996).  excerpts
 Watson, Alan D. "The Lottery in Early North Carolina." North Carolina Historical Review 69.4 (1992): 365–387. Online

External links
 American Gaming Association Gaming industry association
 National Indian Gaming Association Indian gaming industry association

Gambling in the United States